Center Sandwich is a census-designated place in the town of Sandwich in Carroll County, New Hampshire, in the United States. It is the primary settlement in the town and had a population of 156 at the 2020 census. The village center and surrounding area are listed on the National Register of Historic Places as the Center Sandwich Historic District.

The village is home of the Sandwich Fair, held annually in early October.

History
Center Sandwich began as the site of an early gristmill, erected in 1768 by Daniel Beede, which was followed in 1780 by a sawmill, both on the banks of the Red Hill River. Roads were then built to the area, and the village and surrounding rural parts of town grew from about 900 people in 1790 to over 2,000 in 1820. Most of the village's development and growth occurred in the years before the Civil War, resulting in residential and civic buildings that are largely vernacular Federal and Greek Revival in style. Because no railroads were built to serve the area, Center Sandwich declined in importance after the Civil War. Only a small number of changes occurred in the village in the 20th century. The oldest surviving building in the village is the 1792 Baptist church, originally Federal in style, but later given Greek Revival features.

Geography
The CDP is in the south-central part of the town of Sandwich, at the intersection of New Hampshire Route 113 and Route 109. Route 113 leads southwest along the north side of Squam Lake  to Holderness and leads east  to Tamworth.
  
The eastern edge of the CDP follows the Red Hill River, a south-flowing tributary of Lake Winnipesaukee.

Demographics

As of the census of 2010, there were 123 people, 63 households, and 33 families residing in the CDP. There were 89 housing units, of which 26, or 29.2%, were vacant. 15 of the vacant units were for seasonal or recreational use. The racial makeup of the CDP was 97.6% white, 0.8% Native American, and 1.6% from two or more races. None of the population were Hispanic or Latino of any race.

Of the 63 households in the CDP, 17.5% had children under the age of 18 living with them, 39.7% were headed by married couples living together, 11.1% had a female householder with no husband present, and 47.6% were non-families. 39.7% of all households were made up of individuals, and 30.2% were someone living alone who was 65 years of age or older. The average household size was 1.95, and the average family size was 2.67.

16.3% of residents in the CDP were under the age of 18, 2.4% were from age 18 to 24, 15.4% were from 25 to 44, 34.9% were from 45 to 64, and 30.9% were 65 years of age or older. The median age was 54.8 years. For every 100 females, there were 70.8 males. For every 100 females age 18 and over, there were 58.5 males.

For the period 2011-15, the estimated median annual income for a household was $39,737, and the per capita income for the CDP was $20,130.

See also
National Register of Historic Places listings in Carroll County, New Hampshire

References

Census-designated places in New Hampshire
Census-designated places in Carroll County, New Hampshire
Historic districts on the National Register of Historic Places in New Hampshire
National Register of Historic Places in Carroll County, New Hampshire
Sandwich, New Hampshire